Dolores is a feminine given name of Spanish origin.

History
The Spanish word  is the plural form of dolor, meaning either sorrow or pain, which derives from the Latin , which has the same meaning and which may ultimately stem from Proto-Indo-European *delh-, "to chop".

The usage of Dolores as a given name has its origins in the strong influence of the Roman Catholic Church in Spanish-speaking countries. The name is a reference to Nuestra Señora de los Dolores (or La Virgen María de los Dolores), one of the many titles of Mary, Mother of Jesus, typically translated to Our Lady of Sorrows in English.

In given names, Dolores is frequently preceded by the name Maria (María Dolores), the Spanish form of Mary, or one may even bear the entirety of the title (María de los Dolores) as part of their given name. Notable examples of such include the Spanish noblewoman Juana María de los Dolores de León Smith and the Mexican actress Dolores del Río, who was born María de los Dolores Asúnsolo López-Negrete. Less commonly, one might use de los Dolores as part of their name, but not paired with María. Lola, Loli, Lolis, and Lolita are all popular nicknames for individuals named Dolores, based on the name's second syllable.

Variants
Dolors (Catalan)
Delora, Delores, Deloris, Dolores, Dollie (diminutive), Dolly (diminutive), Lola (diminutive), Lolicia (diminutive, rare), Lori (diminutive) (English)
Dolorosa (Esperanto)
Dolorès, Douleurs (French)
Dores (Galician)
Addolorata (Italian)
Dolorosa (Latin)
Dores (Portuguese)
Nekane (Basque)
Dolores, Lola (diminutive), Loli (diminutive), Lolis (diminutive), Lolita (diminutive) (Spanish)
Долорес, Лолита, Лола (Dolores, Lolita, Lola), Долли (diminutive), Лора (diminutive, rare), Лëля (diminutive) (Russian)
Lölä, Ljoolja, Ljolja, Lö (diminutive), Lo (diminutive) (Finnish)
Lola, Lolka,Lolli (Czech)

Famous bearers

Deloris 

 Norma Deloris Egstrom (1920–2002), American singer, better known as Peggy Lee
 Mablean Deloris Ephriam (born 1949), American prosecuting attorney and adjudicator for Divorce Court from 1999 until 2006

Delores 

 Marva Delores Collins (1936–2015), American educator
 Delores Churchill (born 1929) Canadian Haida traditional weaver
 Delores M. Etter (born 1947), American electroengineer
 Delores Ann Richburg Greene (1936–2022), American educator, college dean
 Delores G. Kelley (born 1936), American politician
 Delores McQuinn (born 1954), American politician and minister
 Delores Taylor (1932–2018), American actress, film producer, and writer
 C. Delores Tucker (1927–2005), American civil rights activist
 Delores Ziegler (born 1951), American mezzo-soprano opera singer

Dolores 

 Dolores Alexander (1931–2008), American activist
 Dolores Costello (1903-1979), American actress
 Dolores Crow (1931–2018), American legislator
 Dolores Fonzi (born 1978), Argentine actress
 Dolores Lewis Garcia (born 1938), Native American potter
 Dolores Guinness (1936-2012), German socialite
 Dolores Duran (née Adiléia Silva da Rocha; 1930–1959), Brazilian singer-songwriter
 Dolores Hart, O.S.B. (born 1938), American actress and Roman Catholic nun
Dolores Jiménez Hernández (born 1955), Mexican diplomat 
 Dolores Huerta (born 1930), American labor activist
 Dolores Ibárruri (1895–1989), Spanish politician
 Dolores Keane (born 1953), Irish singer
 Dolores Lambaša (1981–2013), Croatian actress
 Dolores O'Riordan (1971–2018), Irish singer-songwriter and member of The Cranberries
 Dolores Pedrares (born 1973), Spanish hammer thrower
 Dolores del Río (née María de los Dolores Asúnsolo López-Negrete; 1904–1983), Mexican actress
 Juana María de los Dolores de León Smith (1798–1872), Spanish noblewoman and descendant of Juan Ponce de León

Dolours 

 Dolours Price (1950-2013), member of the Provisional Irish Republican Army

Lola 

 Lola Montez (née Marie Dolores Eliza Rosanna Gilbert; 1821–1861), Irish mistress of King Ludwig I of Bavaria

Maria Dolores

Fictional characters 

Delores Landingham, fictional character from The West Wing
 Dolores Belmont, fictional character from Castlevania: Order of Shadows
Deloris Van Cartier, character in the Sister Act franchise
Dolores Umbridge, fictional character from the Harry Potter series
Dolores Haze, fictional character from the novel Lolita
Dolores Abernathy, fictional character from Westworld
Delores Edmund, playable character from Thimbleweed Park
Dolores Dei, fictional deity from Disco Elysium
Dolores, fictional character from Who Framed Roger Rabbit
Delores, fictional character from North and South
Dolores, fictional character from the novel Dolores Claiborne by Stephen King
Dolores, fictional mystery woman character from "The Junior Mint" episode of Seinfeld
Dolores, fictional mannequin from The Umbrella Academy
Dolores Madrigal, fictional character from Disney's Encanto

Other uses 

 Deloris, Australian rock band
 Norma Deloris Egstrom from Jamestown, North Dakota, album by Peggy Lee

References 

Spanish feminine given names
Portuguese feminine given names
Romanian feminine given names